Paris 8 University Vincennes-Saint-Denis is a public university in Paris, France. Once part of the historic University of Paris, it is now an autonomous public institution.

It is one of the thirteen successors of the world's second oldest academic institution, the University of Paris, and was established shortly before the latter officially ceased to exist on 31 December 1970. It was founded as a direct response to events of May 1968. This response was twofold: it was sympathetic to students' demands for more freedom, but also represented the movement of students out of central Paris, especially the Latin Quarter, where the street fighting of 1968 had taken place.

History
Founded in 1969, the new experimental institution was named Centre Universitaire Expérimental de Vincennes (CUEV) in Vincennes. In 1971, it gained full university status, thus allowing it to award its own degrees, and renamed "Université Paris VIII". Since moving to Saint-Denis in 1980, the university has become a major teaching and research centre for humanities in the Île-de-France region.

Tumultuous years
As soon as it opened, Vincennes became the venue for a continuation of 1968, being occupied almost immediately by student radicals, and being the scene of violent confrontations with the police.  One incident, in early 1972, involved a janitors' (travailleurs du nettoyage) strike.  The radicalized janitors invaded classrooms, accused the professors of being scabs, and demanded solidarity.  Meanwhile, there was so much radical leafleting, some university hallways were clogged with ankle-deep crumpled leaflets.

It became particularly notorious for its radical philosophy department, assembled and then headed by Michel Foucault, who in this stage of his career was at his most militant, on one occasion participating in a student occupation and pelting the police outside the building with projectiles. The scandal of this department emerged not around this incident, however, but around one of the philosophy professors, Jacques Lacan's daughter Judith Miller, who was not only a committed communist, like most of the faculty, but indeed a Maoist as well. The department had its accreditation withdrawn after it was revealed that Miller had handed out course credit to strangers she met on a bus. (Miller was subsequently fired by the French education ministry after saying in a radio interview that the university was a capitalist institution and that she was trying to make it function as badly as possible.)

Recent reforms 
Since the turmoil in the late 1960s, the university has endorsed a far more mainstream academic life and has brought in new departments, new professors, and national rules to effect this change. In 1980, the university was relocated to the suburb of Saint-Denis. The university's capacity of 24,000 students per year makes "Paris VIII" an important university with internationally recognized departments in Philosophy, Political Sciences, Cinema Arts, Communication Studies, and Feminist Studies.

Academics
The university offers over a hundred undergraduate, graduate and diploma courses. It is particularly well known for its political science programme as it is the only public university in France to offer this subject at undergraduate level.

The University of Paris VIII also offers some distance-learning opportunities for a select number of subjects such as Law and Psychology.

Affiliations
Paris-VIII is well-connected and has over 250 partnerships with universities around the world. They include the UC Berkeley, the Beijing Film Academy, Boston University, the Free University of Berlin, the Humboldt University of Berlin, the University of Vienna as well as since 2016 the University of Rojava.

Students are encouraged to spend one or two semesters at a neighbouring institution in the US, Canada, Latin America, Asia or Europe in order to develop their language skills and cultural understanding. Alternatively, students also have the possibility to teach French in a high school abroad or to complete an internship.

Notable academics 

Philosophy
 Gilles Deleuze
 François Chatelet
 Alain Badiou
 Etienne Balibar
 Daniel Bensaïd
 Pierre Cassou-Noguès
 Michel Foucault
 Luce Irigaray
 Félix Guattari
 Sylvain Lazarus
 Jean-François Lyotard
 Antonio Negri
 Jacques Rancière
 René Schérer

Psychoanalysis
 Bruce Fink (psychoanalyst)
 Jacques Lacan
 Serge Leclaire
 Jacques-Alain Miller
 François Regnault
 Éric Laurent
 Slavoj Žižek

Politics and international relations
 Gilbert Achcar
 Josué de Castro
 Masri Feki
 Jane Freedman

Economics
 Bernard Maris

Communication sciences
 Armand Mattelart

Hypermedia, new media and cyberculture
 Pierre Lévy

Anthropology
 Alain Bertho

Sociology
 Jon Elster
 Michael Löwy 
 Jean-Claude Passeron 
 Nicos Poulantzas
 Henri Laborit (behavioral biology, systems thinking)

Arts
 Maurice Benayoun
 Christine Brooke-Rose
 Christine Buci-Glucksmann
 Hélène Cixous
 Edmond Couchot
 Frank Popper

Music
 Daniel Charles
 Éveline Plicque-Andréani
 Costin Miereanu

Ethnomusicology
 Giovanna Marini

Linguistics
 Martine Abdallah-Pretceille
 Nicolas Ruwet
 Maurice Gross
 Jean Dubois
 Richard S. Kayne

University Presidents
 Joseph E. Aoun

Notable alumni

Royalty
 Elia, Crown Princess of Albania

See also
 University of Paris
 H2ptm: International conference on Hypertext and hypermedia, products, tools and methods
 Espace Francophone pour la Recherche, le Développement et l'Innovation

References

External links
 Official website (english)
  Papers and documents related to Paris VIII University

University of Paris 8 Vincennes-Saint-Denis
Educational institutions established in 1969
1969 establishments in France
Saint-Denis, Seine-Saint-Denis
Universities descended from the University of Paris